Hsu Tsai-li (5 November 1947 – 19 February 2007) was a Taiwanese politician. He was the Mayor of Keelung City from 2001 to 2007.

Political career
Hsu started his political career as a local borough chief. He served as a councilor at the Keelung City Council in 1982 and became the speaker of the council in 1990, serving for 12 years.

Keelung City Mayoralty

2001 Keelung City mayoralty election
Hsu was elected as the Mayor of Keelung City after winning the 2001 Republic of China local election as the Kuomintang candidate on 1 December 2001 and took office on 20 December 2001.

Amputation
Because of his long-term illness with diabetes mellitus, three toes of his left foot had to be amputated after being infected while he was inspecting a flooded area in Keelung City in 2002.

2005 Keelung City mayor election
During his reelection bid for a second term as Keelung City Mayor, Hsu was accused of involvement in a land procurement scandal. However, with support from Kuomintang Chairman Ma Ying-jeou, Hsu easily defeated his opponent. He won the 2005 Republic of China local election on 3 December 2005 and took office on 20 December 2005.

Corruption scandal
In September 2006, Hsu was expelled from the Kuomintang after he was sentenced to seven years in prison by Taiwan Keelung District Court, which found him guilty of corruption for trying to sell a piece of his own land to the bus department of the Keelung City Government at a large profit. However, he retained his mayoralty position. He then protested his innocence and said that he would appeal the ruling, a move which kept him out of prison under the Law of the Republic of China.

Death
Hsu died on 19 February 2007 due to complications from chronic heart disease after suffering from diabetes mellitus for years.

References

1947 births
2007 deaths
Kuomintang politicians in Taiwan
Mayors of Keelung
Expelled members of the Kuomintang